The 2000 Southern Conference men's basketball tournament took place from March 2–5, 2000 at the BI-LO Center in Greenville, South Carolina. The Appalachian State Mountaineers won their second Southern Conference title and received the automatic berth to the 2000 NCAA tournament.

Format
All twelve teams were eligible for the tournament. The tournament used a preset bracket consisting of four rounds, the first of which featured four games, with the winners moving on to the quarterfinal round. The top two finishers in each division received first round byes.

Bracket
{{4RoundBracket-Byes 
| RD1=First roundMarch 2
| RD2=QuarterfinalsMarch 3
| RD3=SemifinalsMarch 4
| RD4=FinalsMarch 5

| RD1-seed01=4S
| RD1-team01=Chattanooga
| RD1-score01=90
| RD1-seed02=5N
| RD1-team02=Western Carolina| RD1-score02=75

| RD1-seed07=3N
| RD1-team07=UNC Greensboro
| RD1-score07=61
| RD1-seed08=6S
| RD1-team08=Furman| RD1-score08=77| RD1-seed09=4N
| RD1-team09=East Tennessee St.| RD1-score09=85| RD1-seed10=5S
| RD1-team10=The Citadel
| RD1-score10=71

| RD1-seed15=3S
| RD1-team15=Wofford| RD1-score15=81| RD1-seed16=6N
| RD1-team16=VMI
| RD1-score16=72

| RD2-seed01=1N
| RD2-team01=Appalachian State| RD2-score01=88| RD2-seed02=4S
| RD2-team02=Chattanooga
| RD2-score02=66

| RD2-seed03=2S
| RD2-team03=Georgia Southern
| RD2-score03=54
| RD2-seed04=6S
| RD2-team04=Furman| RD2-score04=68| RD2-seed05=1S
| RD2-team05=Coll. of Charleston| RD2-score05=65| RD2-seed06=4N
| RD2-team06=East Tennessee St.
| RD2-score06=51

| RD2-seed07=2N
| RD2-team07=Davidson
| RD2-score07=64
| RD2-seed08=3S
| RD2-team08=Wofford| RD2-score08=65| RD3-seed01=1N
| RD3-team01=Appalachian State| RD3-score01=60| RD3-seed02=6S
| RD3-team02=Furman
| RD3-score02=56

| RD3-seed03=1S
| RD3-team03=Coll. of Charleston| RD3-score03=74| RD3-seed04=3S
| RD3-team04=Wofford
| RD3-score04=64

| RD4-seed01=1N
| RD4-team01=Appalachian State| RD4-score01=68'| RD4-seed02=1S
| RD4-team02=Coll. of Charleston
| RD4-score02=56
}}
* Overtime game''

See also
List of Southern Conference men's basketball champions

References

Tournament
Southern Conference men's basketball tournament
Southern Conference men's basketball tournament
Southern Conference men's basketball tournament